Idem Paris is a 2013 documentary short film, directed by David Lynch. Filmed at the eponymous Idem Paris, a fine art printing studio in Paris, France, and "virtually wordless", it documents the lithographic process. The film was edited by Noriko Miyakawa and mixed by Dean Hurley.

Idem Paris was shot on high definition digital video, presented in black-and-white and released on YouTube. Critics drew comparisons between Idem Paris and Lynch's debut feature film, 1977's Eraserhead, noting that both had "high-contrast black and white images, the focus on specific machinery, and the clanking and hissing array of sounds."

Describing the background of the film, Lynch said:

References

External links
Idem Paris on the Idem Paris website

2013 films
2013 short documentary films
American short documentary films
American black-and-white films
Films shot in Paris
Short films directed by David Lynch
French short documentary films
2010s American films
2010s French films